Hévíz Spa and the Szent András Hospital, Hévíz (St. Andrew's State Hospital for Rheumatology and Rehabilitation) is a spa in Hungary. It is located in Hévíz, on the shores of the lake of the same name.

The story of Hévíz Spa
The complex balneological treatment used in Hévíz has been developed through the centuries as a unique kind of medical care. It is based on three principles:
natural curative effect of the lake
presence of professional medical care
medical diagnosis

The curative effect of the lake was probably known to the ancient Romans. Coins found in the lake in the early 1980s also support this supposition. Discoveries from the age of Migration suggest that the migrant German and Slavic population used the lake as well. Written sources more than 400 years old originate from the age of Ottoman occupation.

First part

The Festetics family realised the curative effect of the lake and started its development as a spa. The lake and its surroundings became the family's property in the middle of the 18th century. Earl György (I.) Festetics (between 1795 and 1797) built a thermal wooden bathing house on a float over the outflow as a start. The first doctors mainly carried out venesections. After the earl's death in 1819 the development of Hévíz stopped. 1 March 1868, György (II.) Festetics got hold of the building sites west of the lake. The building project of the bathing resort (suitable for accommodation of guests) began. The bath looked more or less as it does today. In 1866 the mirrorbath was built.

Second part

In 1905 Vencel Reischl, a brewery owner from Keszthely, became the tenant of the bath and remained so for 35 years. After 1905 Hévíz as a bath had an overnight success and became famous all over the country. Reischl built comfortable, modern hotels, restaurants, buildings instead of the battered fashioned ones. The unique entrance of the bath was finished in 1911 together with the Zander Institution. The unchecked boggy bush disappeared just to allow the newly planted park to appear. The number of visitors increased exponentially.

The new tenant recognised the financial potential of the curative effect of the lake, which can only be exploited if he cooperates with a specialist in his kind of treatments. The first doctor to sign a contract to come here was Dr. Vilmos Schulhof in 1906. In 1911 Dr. Vilmos Schulhof founded the Zander and Röntgen Institution to meet the need for modern physiotherapy. They used gymnastics, powertherapy for treatment and X-ray apparatus for diagnosis. Dr. Ödön Schulhof (Vilmos's brother) was invited to Hévíz from Budapest; here he worked as a specialist in X-ray diagnosis and physiotherapy for the Zander.

The Schulhof brothers in close cooperation with Dr. Moll, Károly were the ones who created the base for this very systematic development of the spa which made it suitable to serve the goals of the Hungarian Health Care System. Dr. Moll, Károly was the first to use subaqualis tractio in the world. World War I checked the growth of the bath, it has increased again since 1923, when the bath fused with the settlement nearby, making the surrounding fields vanish.

Third part

Between 1944-46 the buildings were used as a hospital first by the German then by the Soviet army. In 1948 a period of state ownership came. The State Medicinal Bath, Hévíz (It is the St. Andrew's State Hospital for Rheumatology and Rehabilitation today.) was established by the Ministry of Health on 1 January 1952. The number of visitors tripled then quadrupled. The machinery of the hospital and the treatments were made up to date. By 1968 it has become Hungary's most modern winter bath. For the reconstruction of the bath in the 1970s Austrian larch was used. 1986 3 March central buildings of the bath (in the lake) burnt down. In September 1989 the reconstruction of the destroyed parts was finished. The new set of buildings was more attractive and up to date than the previous one. To day the area of the Institution is 620,000 square metres. The plans of further reconstruction of the park and buildings were completed between 2000 and 2002.

Hévíz is served by Hévíz–Balaton Airport, which is approx.  from the town.

See also
 Lake Hévíz

External links

 The official website of Heviz
 Heviz Virtual Tour - Spa (spherical panorama pictures)
 Aerial photographs: Hévíz

Hospitals in Hungary
Tourist attractions in Zala County
Thermal baths in Hungary
Buildings and structures in Zala County
Spas